Nick Nicholson is an American country singer. He is originally from Greenville, Tennessee and currently resides in Phoenix, Arizona. His first album, "Self Titled" Nick Nicholson (2008) includes fan favorite songs 'Somethin' Somethin', 'This Old Ring', 'Real Women Drive Pickup Trucks', and 'Tell Me How You Like It'. "The Tennessee transplant plays straight up, rockin' country, a combination of twang and bang influenced by the likes of Conway Twitty and Lynyrd Skynyrd".

Discography

Albums
 2008 - Nick Nicholson

Awards
 2007 National Independent Male Country Artist of Year - L.A. Music( F.A.M.E.)
 2008 Independent Male Country Artist of the Year - Phoenix Music Awards (Nominated)

Notes

External links
 Nick Nicholson Official Website

Year of birth missing (living people)
Living people
American country singer-songwriters